Cigarettes & Truckstops is the fourth studio album by Lindi Ortega, released in 2012.

The album was named a longlisted nominee for the 2013 Polaris Music Prize on June 13, 2013.

Track listing
All tracks written by Lindi Ortega unless otherwise noted.

Chart performance

References

2012 albums
Lindi Ortega albums
Last Gang Records albums